La Democracia is a town, with a population of 23,146 (2018 census), and a municipality in the Guatemalan department of Huehuetenango.

References 

Municipalities of the Huehuetenango Department